Abersychan  and Talywain station served the town of Abersychan in the Welsh county of Monmouthshire. The station was the meeting point for two major pre-grouping railways as they competed for the South Wales coal traffic.

History

Opened on 1 May 1878 by the Brynmawr and Blaenavon Railway, it became part of the London and North Western Railway which through the connection with the Heads of the Valleys Line was able to take coal directly to destinations in the Midlands. A junction with the Pontypool and Blaenavon Railway led to joint use once that railway was absorbed into the Great Western Railway.

Passenger use ceased during the Second World War, the first day without service being 5 May 1941, but general goods were carried until 1954 and the line was used by the Big Pit at Blaenavon until the coal mine closed in 1980.

The station site today 

The line through the station site can still be traced on an OS map. A cycle path has been built along the former line and through the site of the former station. The former goods shed of Abersychan and Talywain station near Church Road has also survived and is now used by private firm C & M Haulage.

Whilst the large goods shed was given listed building status on 28 July 1997 by the local Torfaen authority. Reopening the station is one of the long-term aims of the preserved Pontypool and Blaenavon Railway, whom aim to also rebuild the station as part of its expansion plans.

Notes

References

External links
Station on navigable O. S. map
LNWR /GWR Joint status
Position on 1940's map

Disused railway stations in Torfaen
History of Monmouthshire
Former Great Western Railway stations
Former London and North Western Railway stations
Railway stations in Great Britain opened in 1878
Railway stations in Great Britain closed in 1941